Gary Ebbels (born 16 March 1947) is a former Australian rules footballer who played with Fitzroy in the Victorian Football League (VFL) in 1967 and 1968.		
		
Ebbels was a physical education teacher in Ballarat at Sebastopol Technical School, later known as Sebastopol College, for 44 years. He retired in 2011.

References

External links 
		

Living people
1947 births
Australian rules footballers from Victoria (Australia)
Fitzroy Football Club players
East Ballarat Football Club players